Kaiserswald was a Latvian football club from Riga.

In 1922 Kaiserwald won the first Latvian football championship, and retained the title in 1923.

References

Association football clubs established in 1909
Association football clubs disestablished in 1934
Defunct football clubs in Latvia
Football clubs in Riga
1909 establishments in the Russian Empire
1934 disestablishments in Latvia